Camp Washington is a city neighborhood of Cincinnati, Ohio, United States. It is located north of Queensgate, east of Fairmount, and west of Clifton and University Heights. The community is a crossing of 19th-century homes and industrial space, some of which is being converted into loft apartments. The population was 1,234 at the 2020 census.

The first Ohio State Fair was held in Camp Washington in 1850. It had been scheduled the year prior but delayed due to a severe outbreak of cholera.

During the U.S.–Mexican War Camp Washington was an important military location, training 5,536 soldiers who went to war. Camp Washington was annexed to the City of Cincinnati in November, 1869.

This neighborhood is also the location of National Register buildings, including the Oesterlein Machine Company-Fashion Frocks, Inc. Complex and the old Cincinnati Workhouse (designed by Samuel Hannaford), which was destroyed and rebuilt to serve as a drug rehabilitation center. The neighborhood has been home to the award-winning Cincinnati chili parlor, Camp Washington Chili for more than 70 years.

On December 29, 2002, a cow, later named Cincinnati Freedom, escaped a Camp Washington slaughterhouse and eluded capture for eleven days, drawing national attention.  She was captured in the nearby neighborhood of Clifton and lived out the rest of her days at Farm Sanctuary's New York Shelter in Watkins Glen, New York. The event is memorialized in an outdoor mural on Colerain Avenue, Cincinnati, near the site of the former slaughterhouses.

Demographics

Source - City of Cincinnati Statistical Database

References

External links
Community Web site

Neighborhoods in Cincinnati